Early legislative elections took place in France on 23 and 30 June 1968 to elect the fourth French National Assembly of the Fifth Republic. They were held in the aftermath of the events based on the general strike of May 1968. On 30 May 1968, in a radio speech, President Charles de Gaulle, who had been out of the public eye for three days (he was in Baden-Baden, Germany), announced the dissolution of the National Assembly, and a new legislative election, by way of restoring order.

While the workers returned to their jobs, Prime Minister Georges Pompidou campaigned for the "defence of the Republic" in the face of the "communist threat" and called for the "silent majority" to make themselves heard. The Left was divided. The Communists reproached the Federation of the Democratic and Socialist Left (FGDS) leader François Mitterrand for not having consulted it before he announced his candidacy in the next presidential election, and for the formation of a provisional government led by Pierre Mendès-France. The Far-Left and the Unified Socialist Party protested against the passivity of the left-wing parties. The Gaullist Union for the Defence of the Republic became the first party in the French Republic's history to obtain an absolute parliamentary majority. The FGDS disintegrated.

However, the relation between the two heads of the executive power had deteriorated during the crisis. One month later, Georges Pompidou resigned and was replaced by Maurice Couve de Murville.

Results 

|-
| colspan="8"| 
|-
! style="background-color:#E9E9E9;text-align:left;vertical-align:top;" rowspan=2 colspan=3 width=600 |Parties and coalitions
! style="background-color:#E9E9E9;text-align:center;" colspan=2 |1st round
! style="background-color:#E9E9E9;text-align:center;" colspan=2 |2nd round
! style="background-color:#E9E9E9" rowspan=2|Total seats
|-
! style="background-color:#E9E9E9;text-align:right;" |Votes
! style="background-color:#E9E9E9;text-align:right;" |%
! style="background-color:#E9E9E9;text-align:right;" |Votes
! style="background-color:#E9E9E9;text-align:right;" |%
|-
| style="background-color:#0000C8"|
| style="text-align:left;" | Union for the Defense of the Republic – Independent Republicans
Union for the Defense of the Republic (Union pour la défense de la République)
Independent Republicans (Républicains indépendants)
| style="text-align:right;" | UDR-RI
| style="text-align:right;" | 9,667,532
| style="text-align:right;" | 43.65
| style="text-align:right;" | 6,762,170
| style="text-align:right;" | 46.39
| style="text-align:right;" | 354
293
61
|-
|style="background-color:#00CCCC"|
| style="text-align:left;" | Progress and Modern Democracy (Progrès et démocratie moderne)
| style="text-align:right;" | PDM
| style="text-align:right;" | 2,289,849
| style="text-align:right;" | 10.34
| style="text-align:right;" | 1,141,305
| style="text-align:right;" | 7.83
| style="text-align:right;" | 33
|-
|style="background-color:#4C4CB0"|
| style="text-align:left;" | Miscellaneous Right
| style="text-align:right;" | DVD
| style="text-align:right;" | 917,758
| style="text-align:right;" | 4.14
| style="text-align:right;" | 496,463
| style="text-align:right;" | 3.41
| style="text-align:right;" | 9
|- style="background-color:lightblue"
| style="text-align:left;" colspan=2|Total Right ("Presidential Majority" and PDM)
|
| style="text-align:right;" | 12,875,139
| style="text-align:right;" | 58.13
| style="text-align:right;" | 8,399,938
| style="text-align:right;" | 57.62
| style="text-align:right;" | 396
|-
|style="background-color:#FF0000"|
| style="text-align:left;" | French Communist Party (Parti communiste français)
| style="text-align:right;" | PCF
| style="text-align:right;" | 4,434,832
| style="text-align:right;" | 20.02
| style="text-align:right;" | 2,935,775
| style="text-align:right;" | 20.14
| style="text-align:right;" | 34
|-
|style="background-color:#E75480"|
| style="text-align:left;" | Federation of the Democratic and Socialist Left (Fédération de la gauche démocrate et socialiste)
| style="text-align:right;" | FGDS
| style="text-align:right;" | 3,660,250
| style="text-align:right;" | 16.53
| style="text-align:right;" | 3,097,338
| style="text-align:right;" | 21.25
| style="text-align:right;" | 57
|-
|style="background-color:#DE3163"|
| style="text-align:left;" | Unified Socialist Party (Parti socialiste unifié)
| style="text-align:right;" | PSU
| style="text-align:right;" | 1,037,063
| style="text-align:right;" | 4.68
| style="text-align:right;" | 144,361
| style="text-align:right;" | 0.99
| style="text-align:right;" | -
|- style="background-color:pink"
| style="text-align:left;" colspan=2|Total Left
|
| style="text-align:right;" | 9,132,145
| style="text-align:right;" | 41.23
| style="text-align:right;" | 6,177,474
| style="text-align:right;" | 42.38
| style="text-align:right;" | 91
|-
|style="background-color:white|
| style="text-align:left;" | Technique et démocratie
|
| style="text-align:right;" | 77,360
| style="text-align:right;" | 0.35
| style="text-align:right;" | -
| style="text-align:right;" | -
| style="text-align:right;" | -
|-
|style="background-color:white|
| style="text-align:left;" | Mouvement pour la réforme
|
| style="text-align:right;" | 33,835
| style="text-align:right;" | 0.15
| style="text-align:right;" | -
| style="text-align:right;" | -
| style="text-align:right;" | -
|-
|style="background-color:#704214"|
| style="text-align:left;" | Republican Alliance for the Progress and Liberties (Alliance républicaine pour le progrès et les libertés)
| style="text-align:right;" | ARPL
| style="text-align:right;" | 28,736
| style="text-align:right;" | 0.13
| style="text-align:right;" | -
| style="text-align:right;" | -
| style="text-align:right;" | -
|-
|
| style="text-align:left;" | Total
|
| style="text-align:right;" | 22,147,215
| style="text-align:right;" | 100.00
| style="text-align:right;" | 14,577,412
| style="text-align:right;" | 100.00
| style="text-align:right;" | 487
|-
| style="text-align:left;" colspan=8 | Abstention: 20.04% (1st round); 22.17% (2nd round)
|-
|}

National Assembly by Parliamentary Group

1968
1968 elections in France